Chandlery Corner consists of three historic buildings located at Erie, Erie County, Pennsylvania.  They are the Peter Rockwell House, Frederick Schneider House, and Schneider/Kessler Chandlery.

History 
The Peter Rockwell House was built in 1832, as a Federal-style brick townhouse.  It was modified for commercial use about 1865 to be a -story commercial building with a mansard roof.  The Frederick Schneider House was built in 1846, is a two-story five-bay brick dwelling in the Greek Revival style.  The Schneider/Kessler Chandlery was built in 1851, is a three-story six-bay brick commercial building.  The buildings are reflective of the 19th-century business district of Erie.  It was named Chandlery Corner because it is the site of the plant and store of Erie's first soap and candle maker.

It was added to the National Register of Historic Places in 1987.

References

Houses on the National Register of Historic Places in Pennsylvania
Commercial buildings on the National Register of Historic Places in Pennsylvania
Federal architecture in Pennsylvania
Greek Revival houses in Pennsylvania
Houses completed in 1832
Houses completed in 1846
Commercial buildings completed in 1851
Houses in Erie County, Pennsylvania
1832 establishments in Pennsylvania
National Register of Historic Places in Erie County, Pennsylvania